Diego Vidal de Liendo (1622–1648), "the Younger" of that name, was a Spanish painter of the Baroque. He was born at Valmaseda. He was also called Vidal the Younger. He was the nephew of Vidal the elder, and like him was both a painter and a canon of Seville cathedral. He followed his uncle's example in studying in Rome. His paintings for the sacristy of Valencia cathedral include life-size figures of various Saints, and a copy of Raphael's St. Michael triumphing over Satan. Vidal died at Seville.

References

17th-century Spanish painters
Spanish male painters
Spanish Baroque painters
Painters from Seville
1622 births
1648 deaths